The Songo River is a  river in Maine.  The river flows from Brandy Pond at the south end of Long Lake into Sebago Lake at Sebago Lake State Park.  Songo Lock, the last remaining lock of the 19th-century Cumberland and Oxford Canal, controls the elevation of Long Lake and allows navigation of large boats between Long Lake and Sebago Lake.

See also
List of rivers of Maine
Songo River Queen II

References

Maine Streamflow Data from the USGS
Maine Watershed Data From Environmental Protection Agency

Rivers of Maine